A carp is a type of fish.  To carp is to complain.

Carp may also refer to:

in watercraft:
USS Carp (SS-20), American submarine (1911–1917)
USS Carp (SS-338), American submarine (1943–1971)
USNS Marine Carp (T-AP-199), American transport (1945–1958)
Russian submarine K-239 Carp

in geography:
 Carp, Ontario, Canada
 CFS Carp, a Cold War museum in the community ( The Diefenbunker)
 Carp Hills, a landmass in the community
 Carp Road, a road bisecting the community
 Carp Airport, a general aviation airport south of the community
 Carp, Indiana, United States
 Carp, Nevada, United States

in other uses:
 Carp (name), and persons with it
 Hiroshima Toyo Carp, a Japanese baseball team
 Carp, a musical group that featured Gary Busey

CARP may also stand for:

in organizations:
 CARP (Canada), formerly called the Canadian Association of Retired Persons, a senior's advocacy group
 Club Atlético River Plate, Argentine sports club
 Committee for Support to the Reconstruction of the Party (Marxist-Leninist), a Portuguese communist group
 Copyright Arbitration Royalty Panel, a United States government body
 Cultural Assets Rehabilitation Project, an Eritrean architectural heritage project
 Collegiate Association for the Research of Principles, a group affiliated with the Unification Church
 Central Asset Recovery Professionals, an organization started by British comedian John Oliver to illustrate the lack of regulation of the debt buying industry in the United States

in other uses:
 Comprehensive Agrarian Reform Program, a Philippine government policy
 Cache Array Routing Protocol, a computer protocol for HTTP server acceleration
 Common Address Redundancy Protocol, a computer networking protocol to handle fail-over
 Confluent and reticulated papillomatosis, a genetic disorder

See also

Cari (disambiguation)
 The Carp (disambiguation)
 Carp Lake (disambiguation)
 Carp River (disambiguation)
 karp (disambiguation)
 crap (disambiguation)